C. crocea may refer to:

 Canna crocea, a garden plant
 Cassine crocea, a South African tree
 Chlorocypha crocea, a carnivorous insect
 Colias crocea, a small butterfly
 Cymothoe crocea, a Cameroonian butterfly